Liyang Subdistrict is a subdistrict and the county seat of Li County in Hunan, China. The subdistrict was the former Chengguan Town established in 1950, it was reorganized as a subdistrict in 2013. It has 18 communities under its jurisdiction.

External links
 Official Website (Chinese / 中文)

References

Li County, Hunan
County seats in Hunan